Obie Ezekiel Lackey (October 6, 1903 – December 1979) was an American Negro league infielder between 1929 and 1943.

A native of Stony Point, North Carolina, Lackey made his Negro leagues debut in 1929 for the Homestead Grays. He went on to play for several teams, including the Hilldale Club and Philadelphia Stars, and finished his career in 1943 with a short stint with the New York Black Yankees. Lackey died in Philadelphia, Pennsylvania in 1979 at age 76.

References

External links
 and Baseball-Reference Black Baseball stats and Seamheads

1903 births
1979 deaths
Date of death missing
Bacharach Giants players
Baltimore Black Sox players
Brooklyn Royal Giants players
Hilldale Club players
Homestead Grays players
New York Black Yankees players
Philadelphia Stars players
Pittsburgh Crawfords players
Baseball players from North Carolina
People from Stony Point, North Carolina
20th-century African-American sportspeople
Baseball infielders